Xolo may refer to:

 Xolo (company), an Indian smart device company
 Xoloitzcuintle, a dog breed sometimes known as a "Xolo" or "Mexican Hairless Dog"
 Xolos, or Club Tijuana, a Mexican association football team
 Xolo Maridueña, an American actor